Big City is the third studio album by Filipino-American singer Billy Crawford. It was released by V2 Records on April 12, 2004. The album features production from The Corner Boys, Cutfather, Roy "Royalty" Hamilton, Steve Robson, Stargate and Kovas, whose vocals are featured on the tracks. Conceived as an "adult album", Crawford spent several months in Atlanta, New York and London whered he amassed more than sixty songs for Big City. Upon release, the album peaked at number 12 on the French Albums Chart.

Track listing

Charts

References 

2005 albums
Billy Crawford albums
V2 Records albums